Jason Carl Botts (born July 26, 1980) is an American former professional baseball left fielder, designated hitter and first baseman. He played in Major League Baseball (MLB) for the Texas Rangers, and in Nippon Professional Baseball (NPB) for the Hokkaido Nippon Ham Fighters.

Career

Texas Rangers
Botts made his major league debut for the Texas Rangers on September 14, against the Baltimore Orioles, and had a total of 27 at-bats in that month. His fortunes at the plate were somewhat mixed: he scored 8 hits and 3 RBI, but also struck out 13 times.

On May 28, Botts started as the DH against the Oakland Athletics. He hit his first major league home run into the upper deck at Rangers Ballpark in Arlington against the A's Kirk Saarloos in the 2nd inning. On August 1, Botts was called up by the Texas Rangers to be the designated hitter for the remainder of the 2007 season. Through his first eight games, he had a .219 batting average with one home run and four RBI.

On April 29, the Rangers designated Botts for assignment, giving them 10 days to trade, release, or outright him to the minors. On May 7, 2008, the Rangers outrighted Botts to Triple-A Oklahoma.

Hokkaido Nippon Ham Fighters
On June 4, 2008, the Hokkaido Nippon Ham Fighters in Japan's Pacific League acquired him from the Texas Rangers. After the season, he also played in the Mexican Pacific League for the Yaquis de Obregón, Tomateros de Culiacán and most recently for Cañeros de Los Mochis .

Chicago White Sox
Botts was signed to a minor league contract on December 17, 2009, by the Chicago White Sox. Botts was released on March 17, 2010.

Camden River Sharks
Botts started the 2010 season with the Camden River Sharks of the Atlantic League.

Washington Nationals
On June 9, 2010, he was signed to a minor league contract by the Washington Nationals.

Colorado Rockies
On March 26, 2011, Botts signed a minor league contract with the Colorado Rockies. He was released on April 7.

New York Mets
Botts signed with the York Revolution of the Atlantic League for 2011. However, on May 19, he signed a minor league contract with the New York Mets.

Grand Prairie AirHogs
Botts signed with the Grand Prairie AirHogs of the American Association of Independent Professional Baseball and played for them during the 2014 season.

Personal
Botts is one of only two major leaguers to have been born in Paso Robles, California, the other being Hal Rhyne.

References

External links

Yaquis de Obregón

1980 births
Living people
American expatriate baseball players in Japan
American expatriate baseball players in Mexico
Arizona League Rangers players
Baseball players from California
Buffalo Bisons (minor league) players
Camden Riversharks players
Charlotte Rangers players
Frisco RoughRiders players
Glendale Vaqueros baseball players
Grand Prairie AirHogs players
Gulf Coast Rangers players
Hokkaido Nippon-Ham Fighters players
Major League Baseball left fielders
Major League Baseball designated hitters
Mexican League baseball left fielders
Mexican League baseball first basemen
Oklahoma RedHawks players
Piratas de Campeche players
Savannah Sand Gnats players
Stockton Ports players
Sugar Land Skeeters players
Syracuse Chiefs players
Texas Rangers players
York Revolution players